Narasimharajapura is a town panchayat and tehsil headquarters in Chikmagalur, Karnataka, India. It resides in the Malenadu region of Chikmagalur district. The nearest Towns that connect to it are in Bhadravathi (52 km), Channagiri (85), Shimoga (55 km) and Tarikere (67 km). In 1915, Yuvaraja Shri Narasimharaja Wodeyar visited Yedehalli and in his memory, the town was named after him. The taluk was ruled by Ganga, Kadamba, Santhara, Hoysala and Vijayanagara kings.

Geography

Demographics 
As of the 2001 Indian census, Narasimharajapura had a population of 7,441; 51% of the population are males and 49% are females. Narasimharajapura has an average literacy rate of 91%, higher than the state average of 75.3%: male literacy is 93%, and female literacy is 88%. In Narasimharajapura, 12% of the population is under 6 years of age.

Attractions

The Shri Atishaya Kshetra Simhanagadde is located near the town and is famous for being the Atishaya (place of miracles) of Jwalamalini. It is located in the town of Simhanagadde near Narasimharajapura in Chikmagalur district.

Kshetra Simhanagadde is famous for the Atishaya (place of miracles) of Jwalamalini Devi - Yakshini (guardian spirit) of the Eighth Tirthankara, Chandraprabha in Jainism.

Transport

 Nearest airport: Mangalore Airport or Bangalore International Airport
 Nearest railway station: Shimoga

Notable people
 M. K. Indira - popular Kannada novelist
 Sudeep - well-known actor in Kannada cinema
 H.C.Kapinipathi Bhatta -First Engineer from N.R.Pura, who worked closely with Sir M. Visweswariah.

References

External links 
 
 Narasimharajapura
 Simhanagadde - Jain Tirth Darshan

Cities and towns in Chikkamagaluru district